Steve Edwards (born 25 January 1986) is a New Zealand field hockey player who competed in the 2008 Summer Olympics and 2012 Summer Olympics. He currently plays for the Delhi Waveriders in the Hockey India League.

He scored a goal in the penalty shoot-out during the bronze medal match at the 2014 Commonwealth Games, but New Zealand still lost.

References

External links

1986 births
Living people
New Zealand male field hockey players
Olympic field hockey players of New Zealand
Field hockey players at the 2008 Summer Olympics
Field hockey players at the 2012 Summer Olympics
Field hockey players at the 2020 Summer Olympics
Commonwealth Games medallists in field hockey
Commonwealth Games bronze medallists for New Zealand
Field hockey players at the 2010 Commonwealth Games
Field hockey players at the 2014 Commonwealth Games
Delhi Waveriders players
Hockey India League players
Male field hockey midfielders
2010 Men's Hockey World Cup players
2014 Men's Hockey World Cup players
20th-century New Zealand people
21st-century New Zealand people
Medallists at the 2010 Commonwealth Games